Sparks the Rescue's Sparks the Rescue EP is the first EP release from the band since 2007's The Secrets We Can't Keep, and the first release featuring David Pait and Dylan Taylor. After being dropped from Fearless Records, the band funded the EP through Kickstarter, generating more than double their $6000 goal. 
On August 13, the band released a music video for the song "Disaster," which features former member Marty McMorrow.

Track listing
All songs written by Sparks the Rescue.

"Intro" – :29
"Disaster" – 3:11
"Water Your Heart (Safe, Sound, and Buried)" – 3:35
"Last Chance for Romance" – 3:32
"Burn All of My Clothes" – 3:19
"Dream. Catch. Her." – 3:39
"Phoenix" – 4:02

References 

2012 EPs
Kickstarter-funded albums
Sparks the Rescue EPs